Invader, Invaders, The Invader or INVADER may refer to:

Arts and entertainment

Film
 The Invaders (1912 film), a silent film
 The Invader (1935 film), a comedy starring Buster Keaton
 49th Parallel (film) or The Invaders, a 1941 war film
 Invader (1992 film), an American science fiction movie directed by Philip Cook
 The Invader (1997 film), a science fiction movie featuring Sean Young
 The Invader (2011 film), a Belgian film
 Invader (2012 film), a Spanish-French action thriller film

Music
 The Invaders (band), a steelpan band of the 1950s from Saint Kitts
 Invaders (compilation album), a 2006 compilation of metal bands on the Kemado label
 Invaders (Karate High School album), released in 2009
 "Invader", a song from the Judas Priest 1978 album Stained Class
 "Invaders", the opening track of the Iron Maiden album The Number of the Beast
 Invader Volume 1, 2014 EP by Rapture Ruckus
 Invader (album), a 2015 studio album by Rapture Ruckus
 InVader, a 2016 studio album by Reckless Love

Print
 Invaders (comics), two Marvel Comics superhero teams
 Invaders!, a 1985 collection of short stories by Gordon R. Dickson
 Invader (novel), a 1995 novel set in C. J. Cherryh's Foreigner universe
 Invader, the last novel in the science fiction Isaac Asimov's Robots in Time series by William F. Wu
 The Invader (Hilda Vaughan novel), a 1928 novel
 The Invaders, children's novel by Tony Bradman 1993 
The Invaders, horror novel by Brian Lumley  1999 
 The Invaders, three historical stories by Henry Treece 1972 
 The Invaders (Brotherband), the second novel in the Brotherband series by John Flanagan

Television
 "Invaders" (Law & Order), an episode of Law & Order
 "The Invaders" (The Twilight Zone), an episode of The Twilight Zone
 The Invaders, a science fiction series broadcast from 1967 to 1968

Other
 Invader (artist) (born 1969), a French urban artist
 TI Invaders, a 1981 video game for the TI-99/4A home computer
 "The Invader", an episode of the Escape radio program broadcast on March 29, 1953
 InvadR, a wooden roller coaster at Busch Gardens Williamsburg

Sports teams
 Canton Invaders, a defunct indoor soccer team, later the Columbus Invaders
 Denver Invaders, part of the Western Hockey League for the 1963–1964 season
 Hildesheim Invaders, an American football team from Hildesheim, Germany
 Indiana Invaders, an American soccer team in the USL Premier Development League
 Oakland Invaders, part of the United States Football League from 1983 to 1985

Military aircraft
 Douglas A-26 Invader, an American light bomber
 North American A-36 Apache, listed in some sources as Invader, the ground attack/dive bomber version of the P-51 Mustang fighter

Transportation
 Acadian (automobile) Invader, an automobile produced by General Motors of Canada
 Gilbern Invader, a car manufactured by Gilbern Sports Cars (Components) Ltd in Wales
 G-W Invader, a line of recreational power boats
 Ultra-Efficient Products Invader, an American ultralight aircraft
 INVADER, a Japanese satellite

See also
 Ray Columbus & the Invaders, a New Zealand music group of the 1960s
 Lord Invader (1914-1961), calypso musician
 "Invader Invader", a 2013 song by the Japanese singer Kyary Pamyu Pamyu
 Los Invasores (Spanish for "the Invaders"), a Mexican professional wrestling group
 Invader I, ring name for José Huertas González
 Invader II, wrestling ring name for professional wrestler Roberto Soto
 Space Invaders (disambiguation)
 Invasion (disambiguation)